Abner Lawson Duncan (died 1823) was a prominent Louisiana attorney, businessman, politician and aide-de-camp to General Andrew Jackson during the Battle of New Orleans.

Duncan was a member of the "New Orleans Association" which included attorneys Edward Livingston and John R. Grymes, merchant John K. West, smuggler Pierre Laffite, and pirate Jean Laffite.

Duncan ran for governor as a Democratic-Republican during the Louisiana gubernatorial election of 1820, losing to Thomas B. Robertson.

Notes

References
Davis, William C. (2006). The pirates Laffite: the treacherous world of the corsairs of the Gulf. New York: Harcourt Publishing Co., First Harvest edition, 706 pages.
Head, David (2015). Privateers of the Americas: Spanish American privateering from the United States in the early republic. Athens: University of Georgia Press, 224 pages.
The Saunders Family History; Chapter 11, The Chinn Family, pp. 61, 69–74. Internet link: http://www.saundersfamilyhistory.com/pages/chapter11.html

18th-century births
1823 deaths
Year of birth missing
United States Army personnel of the War of 1812
Politicians from New Orleans
Lawyers from New Orleans
Louisiana Democratic-Republicans
United States Army officers
19th-century American lawyers